WOCV (1310 AM) was a radio station licensed to Oneida, Tennessee, United States, which was owned by Oneida Broadcasters, Inc. Its license expired August 1, 2020.

References

External links 
FCC Station Search Details: DWOCV (Facility ID: 50359)
FCC History Cards for WOCV (covering 1958-1979 as WBNT)

OCV
Scott County, Tennessee
OCV
Defunct radio stations in the United States
Radio stations disestablished in 2020
2020 disestablishments in Tennessee
OCV
Radio stations established in 1959
1959 establishments in Tennessee